Vivian Patrick Campbell (born 25 August 1962) is a Northern Irish guitarist. He came to prominence in the early 1980s as a member of Dio, and has been a member of Def Leppard since 1992 (replacing Steve Clark after his death). Campbell has also worked with Thin Lizzy, Whitesnake, Sweet Savage, Trinity, Riverdogs, and Shadow King.

Biography

Campbell began playing guitar at the age of 12 with a Telecaster Thinline and Carlsbro Stingray amp. When he was 15, Campbell joined Teaser, which went on to become Sweet Savage, a NWOBHM band. In 1981 they released an EP consisting of four BBC Radio sessions and their first single, "Take No Prisoners". The band's song "Killing Time" was later covered by Metallica as a B-side for their "The Unforgiven" single, and was included on Metallica's Garage Inc. covers album. Campbell left Sweet Savage in early 1983 to join Dio after guitarist Jake E. Lee was offered Randy Rhoads's spot as Ozzy Osbourne's lead guitarist in December 1982.

Dio
When Campbell joined Dio, Ronnie James Dio, Vinny Appice, and former Rainbow bassist Jimmy Bain had most of the songs to the album Holy Diver already written. The album was a success and included Dio's biggest hit, "Rainbow in the Dark". A concert video, called In Concert, from this tour was released. The band also played at The 4th Monsters of Rock festival at Castle Donington, England in August 1983 and Monsters of Rock, Nuremberg, Germany in 1984.

Dio returned to the studio to write and record the follow-up to Holy Diver. This album was called The Last in Line and charted at No. 23 in the US. "The Last in Line", "We Rock" and "Mystery" all became radio hits. A concert video from this tour called A Special From The Spectrum was released.

The follow-up Sacred Heart was also a success, and managed to peak at No. 29 in the U.S. It featured the hits "Rock N Roll Children" and "Hungry For Heaven", the second of which was also included on the soundtrack to the film Vision Quest. Also around this time the band recorded the song "Hide in the Rainbow" for the Iron Eagle soundtrack, the last song Campbell would record with Dio. A live EP Intermission was also released. Craig Goldy played on the disc's only studio song "Time to Burn" and over-dubbed the rhythm parts on the live tracks. Campbell and the band parted company in 1986 and he joined Whitesnake. He was replaced by Goldy.

Campbell's post-Dio relationship, including how Campbell considered his Dio years relative to his identity as a musician, has at times seemed positive, at times negative.  For example, in 2003 Campbell said "[Playing in Dio] never mattered to me – and still doesn't… He's an incredible talent, but he's an awful businessman and way more importantly, one of the vilest people in the industry." 
Campbell later stated that he regretted making the statement., and Ronnie James Dio stated in an article in Hit Parader that he wished Campbell "the best."
Further, in 2012 Campbell reunited with original Dio members bassist Jimmy Bain and drummer Vinnie Appice, along with vocalist Andrew Freeman, to form the band Last in Line, and Campbell subsequently made statements that suggest he had come to view his time in Dio more positively than he previously had indicated.

Whitesnake
In 1987, Campbell joined English hard rock group Whitesnake, who had recently recorded their album  1987 that would go on to achieve multi-platinum status. Lead vocalist David Coverdale, who had fired all other members of the band during the recording process, was putting together a new line-up with the help of Geffen Records' A&R executive John Kalodner. Along with Campbell, they recruited guitarist Adrian Vandenberg, bassist Rudy Sarzo and drummer Tommy Aldridge. The first time the bandmembers all met each other was at the music video shoot for "Still of the Night". This new line-up would appear in all promotional materials for the aforementioned album despite not playing on any of the songs. Campbell, however, did re-record the guitar solo for the single release of "Give Me All Your Love".

During the supporting tour for the band's self-titled album, Campbell's wife was barred from traveling with the group, due to strife between her and Coverdale's wife Tawny Kitaen; this caused friction between Campbell and Coverdale. After the tour ended, the latter informed the rest of the band that the next Whitesnake album would be written by him and Adrian Vandenberg alone. Vandenberg, for his part, didn't want Campbell in the band. Instead he sought to be Whitesnake's sole guitarist. Campbell later remarked: "I knew deep inside that this wasn’t a band I would last in for too long." Eventually Campbell was informed by Whitesnake's tour manager that he'd been fired. He officially exited Whitesnake in December 1988, with David Coverdale citing musical differences.

Campbell's relationship with Coverdale remained strained for many years after his departure, due to the way Coverdale handled his firing. It wasn't until 2008 when Def Leppard and Whitesnake toured together, that Campbell and Coverdale were able to sort out their past differences. Campbell remarked: "David was very apologetic, and pointed out that he was in this bad relationship, living in an ivory tower, having people do things instead of doing those things by himself. — All this belongs in the past. We are all good now." In 2015, Campbell joined Whitesnake on stage for a performance of "Still of the Night" in Sheffield, England. Campbell has stated, that he doesn't consider Whitesnake an important part of his career: "We were all great individually, but that lineup with those musicians never really gelled. It was fun at the time, and I was flattered to have been invited to be a part of the band, but it doesn’t mean an awful lot to me from a musical point of view."

Lou Gramm, Riverdogs and Shadow King
After leaving Whitesnake, Campbell would go on to play on Lou Gramm's second solo album, Long Hard Look. Though Gramm toured in support of the album, Campbell would not join him. Now a free agent in the business, Campbell joined the group Riverdogs after being tapped to produce their first demo. As an official member of the band, he would contribute to their eponymous debut album in 1990. Campbell once again teamed up with Lou Gramm in 1991 to join Gramm's new band Shadow King. After a single eponymous album, one music video, and one live show, Campbell left the group to join Def Leppard. Shadow King soon disbanded following Campbell's departure as Gramm and bassist Bruce Turgon would return to Gramm's former band Foreigner.

Def Leppard

In April 1992, Campbell joined the rock band Def Leppard, after the release of their Adrenalize album. He replaced Steve Clark, who died on 8 January 1991.

According to fellow guitarist Phil Collen, Campbell was able to lock right into the position very naturally by simply being himself. Campbell made his debut with the band by playing a show in a Dublin club to approximately 600 people.  A week later, 20 April 1992, the band took the stage at the Freddie Mercury Tribute Concert, with their new guitarist. They performed, "Animal", "Let's Get Rocked", and the Queen classic, "Now I'm Here", with Brian May.

Despite treatment for Hodgkin's lymphoma, Campbell continued to tour with Def Leppard during summer 2013, and he and the rest of the band returned to the stage in summer 2014 as co-headliners with Kiss.

Solo and other projects
In 2005 Campbell released a solo album produced by Tor Hyams called Two Sides of If, which features cover versions of his favourite blues tunes and one original blues song. Terry Bozzio plays drums on the album. ZZ Top's Billy Gibbons guests on two songs, and Joan Osborne on one other song.

In mid-2010/early 2011, when Def Leppard was on hiatus, Campbell agreed to join Thin Lizzy, long his favorite band. After the tour, which he said inspired him to play more aggressively, he asked Jimmy Bain and Vinny Appice—both members of the original band Dio—to get together for a Dio tribute project that ultimately became the band Last In Line. With singer Andrew Freeman, they recorded the album Heavy Crown. Bain died before the album was released, and Campbell praised his creativity and his presence, adding that Bain deserved co-writing credits on more of the early Dio songs.

Personal life
Campbell currently lives in New Hampshire and has two daughters with ex-wife Julie Campbell. After getting divorced, Campbell married his longtime girlfriend Caitlin Phaneuf on 4 July 2014. He also plays football regularly with Hollywood United F.C., a team composed mostly of celebrities and former professional football players.

On 10 June 2013 Campbell revealed that he has Hodgkin's lymphoma. Though he announced in November 2013 that he was in partial remission, in June 2014 he took that back saying the statement was premature. He had stem-cell therapy in late 2014, and by October 2015 he announced that while the cancer is still there he was doing much better using immunotherapy, undergoing treatment every three weeks with pembrolizumab.

Discography

Studio albums
 Two Sides of If (2005)

with Sweet Savage
 "Take No Prisoners"/"Killing Time" (1981)
 "Whiskey in the Jar" (2009)

with Dio
 Holy Diver (1983)
 The Last in Line (1984)
 Sacred Heart (1985)
 The Dio E.P. (1986)
 Intermission (1986)
 At Donington UK: Live 1983 & 1987 (2010)

with Hear 'N Aid
 "Stars", "Hungry for Heaven" (1986)

with Whitesnake
 "Give Me All Your Love ('88 Mix)" (1988)

with Riverdogs
 Riverdogs (1990)
 World Gone Mad (2011)
 California (2017)

with Shadow King
 Shadow King (1991)

with Def Leppard
 Retro Active (1993)
 Slang (1996)
 Euphoria (1999)
 X (2002)
 Yeah! (2006)
 Songs from the Sparkle Lounge (2008)
 Mirror Ball – Live & More (2011)
 Viva! Hysteria  (2013)
 Def Leppard (2015)
 Diamond Star Halos (2022)

with Bunny Brunel
 Bunny Brunel's L.A. Zoo (1998)

with Clock
 Through Time (1998)

with Last in Line
 Heavy Crown (2016)
 II (2019)

Guest appearances
 "Desperate" acoustic guitar (from the Vixen album, Vixen) (1989)
 "Broken Dreams", "Hangin' on My Hip", "Day One" guitars (from the Lou Gramm album, Long Hard Look) (1989)
 "Firedance", "Get Down" lead guitar (from the Gotthard album, Gotthard) (1992)
 "Gangbang at the Old Folks Home" guitar solo (from the Steel Panther album, All You Can Eat) (2014)

References

External links

 Official website
 2005 Vivian Campbell Interview by Brian D. Holland for Modern Guitars Magazine
 Vivian Campbell @ DefLeppard.com
 Campbell's 2011 Def Leppard Guitar Rig & Gear Setup. GuitarGeek.com
 Career Retrospective Interview with Vivian Campbell from March 2016, from Pods & Sods

1962 births
Living people
20th-century British guitarists
21st-century British guitarists
Def Leppard members
Guitarists from Northern Ireland
Rock guitarists from Northern Ireland
Expatriates from Northern Ireland in the United States
People from Lisburn
Shadow King members
Ulster Scots people
Whitesnake members
Thin Lizzy members
Lead guitarists
Rhythm guitarists
Dio (band) members
Hollywood United players
People educated at Rathmore Grammar School
Association footballers not categorized by position
Musicians from Belfast
Association football players not categorized by nationality